Squid is a fictional supervillain appearing in American comic books published by Marvel Comics. Squid first appears in Peter Parker: Spider-Man vol. 2 #16 and was created by Howard Mackie and John Romita Jr.

Fictional character biography
After his mother died, Don Callahann had a hard time relating to his father, "Big Mike" Callahan. He eventually fell into the wrong crowd and ended up transformed into a mouthless squid-like creature. In his first outing as a supervillain, Squid and his girlfriend Ms. Fortune battled Spider-Man on a rooftop. Spider-Man defeated them.

After their failure, the ones responsible for Squid's creation attacked him and Ms. Fortune (who barely survived). She broke up with Squid. Squid was later hired by an unnamed Upper West Side crime boss to eliminate the local businessmen that won't sell their properties to him. Squid later dragged a cigar store owner named "Old Man" Frenzetti into the sewers and later killed him. He later confronted his father at a bar and then stormed out as Peter Parker entered. Squid later came up through the sink pipes of Miguel Vargas' coffee shop in an attempt to kill him. Miguel escaped as Mike Callahan attacked him with a baseball bat. Squid broke the bat, but was blindsided by Spider-Man. Both Spider-Man and Mike managed to calm Squid down with Mike telling his son his apology for the way he treated him. After a long talk in the night, Squid was presumably taken away by the police.

During the "Civil War" storyline, Squid was among the villains recruited into Hammerhead's unnamed supervillain army to take advantage of the Civil War. Unfortunately for the assembled villains, Iron Man and a number of S.H.I.E.L.D. Agents raided their headquarters.

Squid was among the villains recruited into Hood's unnamed crime syndicate.

During the "Secret Invasion" storyline, Squid is one among many supervillains who joined the Hood's crime syndicate in attacking the invading Skrull force.

During the "Dark Reign" storyline, Squid is seen assisting some of Hood's operatives in a raid where he and Man-Fish go into the water to get to secure a valued ship. He is seen relaxing in a lounge area inside one of the Hood's facilities. Squid accompanies Hood when his Crime Syndicate attacks Mister Negative and his gang. He alongside Answer, Lightmaster, Scorcher, Speed Demon, Spot, and White Rabbit are knocked down by Spider-Man (who was corrupted to Mister Negative's side). The Squid also attacks one of Mister Negative's criminal operations, a brothel.

Squid is later recruited by Max Fury to join the Shadow Council's incarnation of the Masters of Evil. He and Whiplash helped to subdue John Steele who is then taken down by Vengeance. Boomerang and Owl then hire Squid onto the Sinister Sixteen, assembled to distract the Chameleon's forces while Boomerang steals from him.

During the "AXIS" storyline, Squid and his gang called the Tentacles commit a robbery and take a family hostage. Spider-Man heads out to save the day, but is beaten to the scene by the morally inverted Carnage who defeats and webs up Squid leaving behind a note that reads "From Your Friendly Neighborhood Carnage!" Spider-Man is surprised at this heroic action that Carnage committed.

Squid was among the villains that joined Swarm's Sinister Six at the time when Spider-Man and the students of the Jean Grey School for Higher Learning. After Hellion defeated Swarm, Squid and the other villains surrendered.

During the "Avengers: Standoff!" storyline, Squid was an inmate of Pleasant Hill, a gated community established by S.H.I.E.L.D.

Squid later appears as a member of the Hateful Hexad alongside Bearboarguy, Gibbon, Ox, Swarm, and White Rabbit. During the Hateful Hexad's disastrous fight against Spider-Man and Deadpool, the battle is crashed by Itsy Bitsy who threw one of her swords at the forehead of a webbed-up Squid.

During the "Opening Salvo" part of the "Secret Empire" storyline, Squid turned up alive as he was shown to have been recruited by Baron Helmut Zemo to join the Army of Evil.

In a prelude to the "Hunted" storyline, Squid is among the animal-themed characters captured by Taskmaster and Black Ant for Kraven the Hunter's upcoming Great Hunt. Squid watched the fight between Spider-Man and Scorpion until the Hunter-Bots arrived. Then he is seen fleeing from the Hunter-Bots. When Kraven the Hunter has Arcade lower the forcefield, Squid is among the animal-themed characters that are freed.

Powers and abilities
Squid can shift between his human form and his mouthless squid-like form. In his squid-like form, he possesses extendable tentacles that restrain a human with Class 10 strength. Squid can also emit foul-smelling ink from his hands. He later had an ability to emit ink constantly from his entire body. Seeing how he can fit through pipes, Squid is presumably boneless in this form.

Reception
 In 2020, CBR.com ranked Squid 6th in their "Spider-Man: 10 Weirdest Animal Villains From The Comics That We'd Like To See In The MCU" list.

References

External links
 Squid (Don Callahan) at the Appendix to the Handbook of the Marvel Universe

Characters created by Howard Mackie
Characters created by John Romita Jr.
Comics characters introduced in 2000
Marvel Comics characters who are shapeshifters
Marvel Comics characters with superhuman strength
Spider-Man characters